The Governor of Khmelnytskyi Oblast is the head of executive branch for the Khmelnytskyi Oblast.

The office of Governor is an appointed position, with officeholders being appointed by the President of Ukraine, on recommendation from the Prime Minister of Ukraine, to serve a four-year term.

The official residence for the Governor is located in Khmelnytskyi.

Governors
 Yevhen Huselnykov (1992–1994, as the Presidential representative)
 Yevhen Huselnykov (1995–1998, as the Governor)
 Viktor Lundyshev (1998–2004)
 Viktor Kotsemyr (2004–2005)
 Vitaliy Oluiko (2005)
 Ivan Hladunyak (2005–2006)
 Oleksandr Bukhanevych (2006–2007)
 Ivan Havchuk (2007–2010, acting in 2007) 
 Vasyl Yadukha (2010–2014)
 Leonid Prus (2014)
 Mykhailo Zahorodniy (2015)
 Oleksandr Korniychuk (2016–2018)
 Vadym Lozovy (2018-2019)
 Volodymyr Kalnychenko (2019, acting)
 Dmytro Gabinet (2019–2020)
 Roman Prymush (2020, acting)
 Serhiy Hamaliy (2020-2023)

Notes

References

Sources
 World Statesmen.org

External links
Government of Khmelnytskyi Oblast in Ukrainian

 
Khmelnytskyi Oblast